Aguelal   is a human settlement in the Arlit Department of the Agadez Region of northern-central Niger.

External links
Satellite map at Maplandia

Populated places in Niger
Agadez Region